The Savoia-Marchetti S.84 was an Italian twin-engined airliner developed in Italy, from the three-engined Savoia-Marchetti S.73; only the prototype was completed and the designation was re-used for the Savoia-Marchetti SM.84.

Specifications (S.84 prototype)

Notes

References

 

S.84
1930s Italian airliners
World War II Italian transport aircraft
Low-wing aircraft
Twin piston-engined tractor aircraft
Aircraft first flown in 1936